Āchamanam (Sanskrit:)  is part of any ritual in the Hindu tradition and is done in the starting. It is a purification ritual that is believed to cure all physical and mental impurities.

Types of Āchamanam

There are three types of Āchamanam, namely, Śrautācamanam, Smṛtyācamanam and Purāṇācamanam.

However, in Sandhyavandana, there exists fourth version of āchamana, known as mantrācamana.

Śrautācamanam
In śrautācamanam, water is sipped thrice accompanied by the recitation of the three padas of Gayatri in succession. Then, 21 parts of the body are touched while the 21 mantras are recited the nine Abliṅgas  and the seven Vyahritis i.e. names of the seven worlds preceded by pranava, the sacred syllable OM and the 3 padas of Gayatri siras. It is defined in ṣatkarma candrikā as

Smṛtyācamanam
Smṛtyācamanam can be viewed as an abridged version of śrautācamanam. Water is sipped thrice accompanied by uttering svāhā. Then, 9 parts of the body are touched by recitation of the sutras that instruct this achamana.

Purāṇācamanam
Purāṇācamanam is done with the 24 names of Vishnu starting with keśava, etc. The water is poured on the right hand palm, which made as gokurna sipped thrice with the first three names and both hands are washed with the next two names. For the remaining 19 names different parts of body are ritually cleansed.

References

Notes

Rituals in Hindu worship
Water and Hinduism